Ampelomyia conicocoricis is a species of fly in the family Cecidomyiidae. It induces galls on grape plants in Japan. This is the type species for the genus.

References

Cecidomyiinae
Insects described in 2019
Gall-inducing insects
Taxa named by Ayman Khamis Elsayed
Taxa named by Makoto Tokuda
Insects of Japan
Diptera of Asia